Ålem is a locality situated in Mönsterås Municipality, Kalmar County, Sweden with 803 inhabitants in 2010.

References 

Populated places in Kalmar County
Populated places in Mönsterås Municipality